Sleeper car may refer to:

 Sleeping car, a railroad passenger car that can accommodate its passengers in beds
 Sleeper (car), a car that has an unassuming exterior but is capable of high performance